{{DISPLAYTITLE:C25H28O6}}
The molecular formula C25H28O6 (molar mass: 424.49 g/mol, exact mass: 424.1886 u) may refer to:

 Arugosin C
 Sophoraflavanone G